Wattsburg is a borough in Erie County, Pennsylvania, United States. The population was 352 at the 2020 census. It is part of the Erie Metropolitan Statistical Area.

History
Incorporated in 1833, Wattsburg was once a thriving stagecoach center.

Geography
Wattsburg is located in eastern Erie County at  (42.002903, -79.809321). It is bordered to the west, north, and east by Venango Township, and to the south by Amity Township.

Wattsburg is at the junction of French Creek with its West Branch. The borough is in the Allegheny River watershed.

Demographics

As of the census of 2000, there were 378 people, 148 households, and 97 families residing in the borough. The population density was 1,160.8 people per square mile (442.3/km²). There were 166 housing units at an average density of 509.8 per square mile (194.2/km²). The racial makeup of the borough was 99.47% White, 0.26% from other races, and 0.26% from two or more races. Hispanic or Latino of any race were 0.53% of the population.

There were 148 households, out of which 30.4% had children under the age of 18 living with them, 45.9% were married couples living together, 14.2% had a female householder with no husband present, and 33.8% were non-families. 26.4% of all households were made up of individuals, and 8.8% had someone living alone who was 65 years of age or older. The average household size was 2.55 and the average family size was 3.13.

In the borough the population was spread out, with 24.6% under the age of 18, 10.6% from 18 to 24, 29.6% from 25 to 44, 23.8% from 45 to 64, and 11.4% who were 65 years of age or older. The median age was 35 years. For every 100 females there were 92.9 males. For every 100 females age 18 and over, there were 96.6 males.

The median income for a household in the borough was $32,500, and the median income for a family was $37,813. Males had a median income of $29,250 versus $25,156 for females. The per capita income for the borough was $14,830. About 17.6% of families and 17.9% of the population were below the poverty line, including 16.2% of those under age 18 and 51.4% of those age 65 or over.

References

External links

Wattsburg Area School District

Populated places established in 1828
Boroughs in Erie County, Pennsylvania
1833 establishments in Pennsylvania